The Prajadhipok, also known as Fighter Type 5, was a Siamese single-seat biplane fighter. It was the second indigenous Siamese aircraft design and the first fighter aircraft.

Lieutenant Colonel Luang Neramit Baijayonta designed and oversaw construction of the aircraft in 1929, which was named Prajadhipok (Democrat) for the then reigning monarch King Prajadhipok (Rama VII). It was the second aircraft designed and built in Siam and the first Siamese designed and built fighter, designated Fighter Type 5. However it remained experimental and production does not seem to have ensued, possibly due to the death of the designer shortly after the first flight. The aircraft was still in service at the start of World War II.

Specifications (Prajadhipok Fighter type 5.)

References

Citations

Bibliography
Forsgren, Jan. "Aircraft Production in Thailand: Part 2". aeroflight. 20 November 2004. Retrieved 22 February 2011.

Aircraft manufactured in Thailand
1920s Thai fighter aircraft